Sir Humphrey Briggs, 4th Baronet (c. 1670 – 8 December 1734), of Haughton, Shropshire, was an English Whig politician who sat in the English and British House of Commons between 1701 and 1727.

Briggs was the eldest son of Sir Humphrey Briggs, 3rd Baronet, of Haughton  and Ernstrey Park, near Diddlebury, Shropshire and his wife Barbara Wyndham, daughter of Sir Wadham Wyndham of Norrington, Wiltshire. He matriculated at Wadham College, Oxford on 2 July 1687, aged 17 and was admitted at Lincoln's Inn in 1687. He succeeded his father in the baronetcy on 31 January 1699.

Briggs was elected as Whig Member of Parliament (MP) for Shropshire in the general election of February 1701. However he was defeated in the November 1701 general election. In July 1702 he was returned unopposed as MP for Bridgnorth and was re-elected in a contest in 1705. He was returned unopposed for Bridgnorth in the 1708 general election. The 1710 British general election was dominated by the issue of the impeachment and Briggs and the other Whig Member for Bridgnorth, were narrowly defeated by two Tories in a fierce contest.

Briggs did not stand at the 1715 general election, but was returned at a by-election at Much Wenlock on 13 July 1716. He was convincingly returned for Wenlock at the 1722 general election and stood down in 1727. 
            
Briggs died unmarried on 8 December 1734 and was succeeded in the baronetcy by his brother, Hugh.

References

1670 births
1734 deaths
Baronets in the Baronetage of England
Politicians from Shropshire
Members of the Parliament of Great Britain for English constituencies
English MPs 1701
English MPs 1702–1705
English MPs 1705–1707